Salix sieboldiana is a species of willow native to Kyūshū (Japan). It is a deciduous shrub or small tree.

The Latin specific epithet sieboldiana refers to German physician and botanist Philipp Franz von Siebold (1796-1866).

The bark of the tree contains flavanols and procyanidins.

References

sieboldiana
Flora of Japan